Bryan Lee Slaton (born February 2, 1978) is a former pastor and American politician. He has represented the 2nd District in the Texas House of Representatives since 2021. A member of the Republican Party, Slaton also works for his brother's financial service business.

Early life, education, and career
Born in Mineola, Texas. He attended Ouachita Baptist University, where he received a BA in youth ministry and speech communication. He then attended University of North Texas and earned a degree in accounting. Slaton later earned a Master of Divinity from Southwestern Baptist Theological Seminary. He served in the ministry as a youth and family minister for 13 years, for three of those years at River Hills Baptist Church in Corpus Christi, Texas. Bryan works for his brother's small business, Slaton Financial Services.

Career
In 2016, Slaton filed to run against incumbent state representative Dan Flynn. On March 1, 2016, Slaton narrowly lost to the incumbent in the Republican primary. Flynn polled 14,917 votes (51 percent) to Slaton's 14,336 (49 percent). In 2018, Slaton decided to take on the incumbent again. In the 2018 primary election, Flynn defeated Slaton again, 11,803 (51.7 percent) to 11,013 (48.3 percent).

However, on July 14, 2020, Slaton defeated Flynn by a 22-point margin in the Republican primary runoff, forcing the incumbent into a runoff election. Slaton ran to Flynn's right. Slaton criticized Flynn for unnecessary and superfluous spending. He sent out mail which pointed out Flynn's campaign-funded lifestyle expenses such as nearly $14,000 in spending on cookies and using his campaign fund to pay for a Netflix subscription. Slaton campaigned on abolishing property taxes, ending overly broad laws that give government excess power during emergencies, and pledging to oppose any tax increase.

In March 2021, Slaton introduced a bill that would abolish abortion and make it a criminal act, whereby women and physicians who received and performed abortions, respectively, could receive the death penalty. The bill made no exceptions for rape or incest; it did provide exemptions for ectopic pregnancies that threaten the life of the woman "when a reasonable alternative to save the lives of both the mother and the unborn child is unavailable."

In June 2022, Slaton said in a social media post that he planned to introduce legislation in the 2023 legislative session that would ban minors from drag shows in Texas.

Slaton supports a ban on Democrats being given committee chairmanships as long as the Republicans hold the majority of seats in the Texas House. On December 6, 2022, Slaton proposed a rule change to the Texas House Administration Committee that would end Democrats receiving committee chairmanships. These chairmanships enable them to kill conservative priority legislation.

On February 27, 2023, Slaton introduced HB 2889, “A bill to be entitled”, https://legiscan.com/TX/text/HB2889/2023 which would allow a tax credit for straight married residents of Texas, “Qualifying married couple”, who have never been divorced, bringing forth further discrimination based on specific religious beliefs.

On March 6, 2023, Slaton introduced HB 3596, the "Texas Independence Referendum Act" (TEXIT), which would allow for a referendum to investigate the secession of Texas from the U.S. The U.S. Supreme Court case Texas v. White ruled in 1869 that the Constitution did not permit states to unilaterally secede from the United States.

References

External links
 Campaign website
 State legislative page

1978 births
Living people
Republican Party members of the Texas House of Representatives
21st-century American politicians
People from Royse City, Texas
American Christians